Veterans Inc. (formerly known as  The Central Massachusetts Shelter for Homeless Veterans and Massachusetts Veterans Inc.) is  a national, non-governmental, and non-profit organization, which was founded in 1990. It has been devoted to the cause of "providing services to veterans in need and their families across New England" by giving shelter to honorably-served veterans who have lost their homes and suffer from other possible disabilities. The organization is headquartered in Worcester, Massachusetts.

History 
In 1990, a small "band of brothers", Vietnam veterans, alarmed at seeing their fellow veterans living in alleys and under bridges, incorporated Veterans Inc. (then the Central Massachusetts Shelter for Homeless Veterans). In October 1991, the group received the keys to the historic Massachusetts National Guard Armory from the Commonwealth of Massachusetts, with a contract to lease the building for a dollar per year. Abandoned for about 12 years, the building had been condemned and was slated for demolition. In four months, the veterans collected $17,000 in cash donations and, with the help of volunteers including labor unions, completed $250,000 worth of renovations.

With an all-volunteer staff, the doors opened to nine homeless Vietnam veterans on January 20, 1992. The building was still in such bad shape that only a small section of the first floor was used. The utilities were non-functioning, the windows blown out, walls had collapsed and the roof was pierced by huge holes. Rumor has it that every pigeon in the City of Worcester lived at 69 Grove Street. But these humble living conditions were better than the alternative for many. As the first years passed, Veterans Inc. repaired the building a little at a time. Most of the work was performed by the residents and volunteers. An estimated $5 million in volunteer and donated services has been invested over the past 20 years to rescue the historic building and expand services for veterans.

In 1993, Lt. Colonel Vincent J. Perrone USAF (Retired) was named president of the organization, a position he still holds today. He recruited Board Member Denis Leary (former Director of the Substance Abuse Center at Community Healthlink), and the two lifelong friends took the fledgling organization from $100,000 in debt to operating in the black in less than a year.  They expanded the agency's focus to include veterans of all eras, and women veterans. In fact, Veterans Inc. was the first facility in the nation to offer in-house services to female veterans (in 1994) and the first in the state of Massachusetts to operate a residential Women and Children's Program.
Soon after assuming leadership of the organization, Perrone and Leary realized that a 30-day "alcohol and substance free" emergency shelter – even if it put a roof over the veterans' heads and food in their stomachs – was not enough to keep veterans off the streets.  First, homelessness couldn't be solved if the veterans had no income. Some veterans moved out only to end up back at the shelter. So the Employment & Training program was created, including partnerships with employers that resulted in better jobs.  Furthermore, if mental health support was not provided, or physical rehabilitation, the veterans often couldn't hold jobs, or adapt to living on their own after leaving the shelter. So Health & Wellness services were added.

This "triangle of needs" – housing, employment and health – evolved into a comprehensive program of supportive services that addressed the myriad of issues veterans contend with. This model was developed and refined over the years into the nationally recognized clinical model employed at Veterans Inc. today.  This holistic approach entails providing every possible service, from legal advice to disability benefit applications, all under the auspices of a case manager, who works with every veteran to create a treatment plan tailored to that individual's strengths and challenges.

In 2009, the organization was renamed Veterans Inc. in recognition of its new programs and offices in all six New England states. The grassroots, all-volunteer operation of 1990 has grown into a professional, comprehensive, award-winning organization that provides care to thousands of veterans and their families every year.

In 2010, the Employment & Training Program was awarded the Elevate America Veterans Initiative Grant through Microsoft to provide veterans with a comprehensive set of services over the next two years. The program also allows Veterans Inc. to expand employment and trainings services to veterans' spouses and the National Guard and Reserve components of the military. In 2011 and 2012, The U.S. Department of Labor and the National Coalition for Homeless Veterans recognized Veterans Inc. Employment and Training Program as an example of "Top Best Practices". Veterans Inc. was recognized with the 2013 "Seal of Distinction" from the Call of Duty Endowment for their efforts to help veterans in need, and specifically for their effectiveness and efficiency in placing veterans in jobs.

The agency is still headquartered from the former Massachusetts National Guard Armory on Grove Street in Worcester. In addition, Veterans Inc. operates residential programs for veterans at several other Worcester sites (including a program for female veterans and their dependent children on Sheridan Street), in addition to sites in Shrewsbury, Massachusetts and Devens, Massachusetts. Veterans Inc. also operates a residential program in Bradford, Vermont, Lewiston, Maine, and New Britain, Connecticut.

National service
In 2015 Veterans Inc. received for the second time the  "Outstanding Member Award" from Then National Coalition for Homeless Veterans. In 2013 Veterans Inc. received the  Call of Duty Endowment  "Seal of Distinction" from the Call of Duty Endowment for its efforts to help veterans in need, and specifically for our effectiveness and efficiency in placing veterans in jobs. 
In 2004, 2007, 2011 and 2012; the U.S. Department of Labor (DOL) and the National Coalition for Homeless Veterans (NCHV) identified the Veterans Inc. Employment and Training Program as an example of "Top Best Practices."  The Homeless Veterans Reintegration Program Best Practices Project was produced by the National Coalition for Homeless Veterans (NCHV) in partnership with the U.S. Department of Labor-Veterans' Employment and Training Service (DOL-VETS). Veterans Inc. receives grant funding through this program, and the organization serves as a guidepost for other community-based homeless service providers throughout the country that are developing employment  assistance programs.

In 2009, Secretary of U.S. Department of Veterans Affairs awarded Veterans Inc. the Secretary's "Outstanding Service Provider Award" for 2009.   The event, held in Washington DC, was part of the VA's National Summit Ending Homelessness Among Veterans.  Veterans Inc. was selected from more than 1,000 organizations serving veterans nationwide.  "Veterans Inc. plays a vital role in improving the lives of veterans and their families in our community, and throughout   New England" said Congressman James P. McGovern, who attended the award ceremony. "I know Veterans Inc. provides    outstanding programs and services, and I am so pleased that the Department of Veterans Affairs is recognizing the organization as a leader in ending homelessness among veterans.  This award confirms the standard of excellence set by Veterans Inc. in the provision of services for veterans and their families."

The National Coalition for Homeless Veterans (NCHV) awarded Veterans Inc. the "2009 Outstanding Member Award" at the Coalition's annual convention. Veterans Inc. was selected from more than 250 veterans' supportive services organizations  nationwide for this award.

References

Charities based in Massachusetts
Organizations based in Worcester, Massachusetts
American veterans' organizations